Queens Park is a suburb of Chester. It is in the south of the city of Chester, just east of Handbridge. It includes a secondary school, Queens Park High School and also has a pedestrian suspension bridge link with the main city.

Politics

Local Government
Queens Park forms part of the Cheshire West and Chester council area.

British Parliament
Queens Park is in the City of Chester parliamentary constituency and is represented by Samantha Dixon, who has held the seat since December 2022.

Areas of Chester